There are two rivers named Taquaraçu River in Brazil:
 Taquaraçu River (Mato Grosso do Sul)
 Taquaraçu River (Espírito Santo)

See also
 Taquaruçu River, Mato Grosso do Sul, Brazil
 Taquaruçu River (São Paulo), Brazil